Kord Kandi (also Romanized as Kord Kandī; also known as Kordlar, Kūkandī, Kukendi, and Kukendy) is a village in Esperan Rural District, in the Central District of Tabriz County, East Azerbaijan Province, Iran. At the 2006 census, its population was 43, in 11 families.

References 

Populated places in Tabriz County